Luke Bezzina (born 7 May 1995) is a Maltese sprinter. He competed in the men's 100 metres at the 2016 Summer Olympics.

International competitions

Personal Bests
Outdoor

References

External links

Living people
1995 births
Athletes (track and field) at the 2016 Summer Olympics
Maltese male sprinters
Olympic athletes of Malta
European Games competitors for Malta
Athletes (track and field) at the 2015 European Games
Competitors at the 2015 Summer Universiade